This is a list of football (soccer) clubs in South Sudan.
For a complete list see :Category:Football clubs in South Sudan

A
Al Hilal Juba
Al-Malakia FC
Al Merreikh Juba
Atlabara
Aweil Stars F.C.
Saint Andrews F. C

E
El Nasir Football club

M
Merreikh Aweil F.C.

S
Salaam Aweil F.C.

T
Talanga FC

W
Wau Salaam F.C.

N
Nimule Customs F.C.

Sources
 South Sudan 2011
 South Sudan 2012
 South Sudan 2013

South Sudan

Football clubs